Theretra hausmanni is a moth of the  family Sphingidae. It is known from Sulawesi in Indonesia.

The wingspan is 71–81 mm for males and 76–82 mm for females. It is very similar to Theretra manilae but distinguishable by its larger size. The forewing upperside is similar to Theretra manilae but the area between the fifth and sixth postmedian lines is strongly divergent over the posterior half of the wing so that they are widely separated on the inner margin, the area between them largely filled with olive-green or brown, forming a wedge-shaped band similar to that in Hyles species. The submarginal line has conspicuous vein dots.

References

Theretra
Moths described in 2000